Gleadovia konyakianorum is a species of parasitic plant native to the Mon district in Nagaland, India.

The species named in honour of the Konyak people in Nagaland.

Description
The species is a holoparasite, meaning that it derives its entire nutritional requirement from its host plant, which is a species of the genes Strobilanthes. It has no chlorophyll, but has a vascular system and absorbs nutrients from the host plant using a haustorium. The species is a root parasite, grows up to a height of 10 cm and bears white and tubular flowers.

References

Parasitic plants
Orobanchaceae